Pool A of the 2015 Rugby World Cup began on 18 September and was completed on 10 October 2015. The pool was composed of hosts England, as well as the third- and fourth-placed teams from 2011, Australia and Wales. They were joined by the Oceania qualifier, Fiji, and the repechage qualifier, Uruguay. The group was called the group of death, with four of the five teams in the top 10 of the World Rugby Rankings going into the tournament. Australia and Wales qualified for the quarter-finals.

Overall

All times are local United Kingdom time (UTC+01)

England vs Fiji

Notes:
 Ben Youngs earned his 50th test cap for England.

Wales vs Uruguay

Notes
 This was the first ever match between these nations.

Australia vs Fiji

England vs Wales

Notes:
 This was the first time the host nation had lost a match in the pool stage since France lost to Argentina 17–12 in 2007.

Australia vs Uruguay

Notes:
 Diego Magno earned his 50th test cap for Uruguay.
 Drew Mitchell scored his 12th World Cup try, surpassing Chris Latham's Australian World Cup record of 11 tries.

Wales vs Fiji

Notes:
 Taulupe Faletau and Dan Lydiate earned their 50th test cap for Wales.	
 Akapusi Qera earned his 50th test cap for Fiji.

England vs Australia

Notes:
 With this loss, England became the first host nation since Wales in 1991 not to make it out of the Pools.
 This was Australia's largest winning margin over England in England, while scoring the most points against them in England.

Fiji vs Uruguay

Notes:
 Mario Sagario earned his 50th test cap for Uruguay.

Australia vs Wales

Notes:
 This was the first match that both Australia and Wales have failed to score a try since Wales' 6–0 win in 1947.

England vs Uruguay

Notes:
 Alejo Corral earned his 50th test cap for Uruguay.
 Nick Easter became the oldest player ever to score an international hat-trick.

References

External links
 Official RWC 2015 Site

Pool A
Pool
2015–16 in English rugby union
2015–16 in Welsh rugby union
2015 in Fijian rugby union
2015 in Uruguayan sport